Lieutenant-Colonel Sir James Nockells Horlick, 4th Baronet, OBE, MC (1886–1972) was the second son of Sir James Horlick, first holder of the Horlick Baronetcy, of Cowley Manor in the County of Gloucester, England, and Margaret Adelaide Burford. James, the 1st Baronet, was co-inventor (with his brother William) of Horlicks Malted Milk drink.

A recipient of the MC from both the UK and Greece for his actions during World War I, he briefly served as MP for Gloucester, was chairman of Horlicks Ltd and in later life become a renowned breeder of rhododendrons at his island home at Gigha in the west of Scotland.

Biography
Born in Brooklyn, New York on 22 March 1886, James was educated at Eton College and Christ Church, Oxford. While at Oxford Horlick played one first-class cricket match for Oxford University Cricket Club against Yorkshire in 1906, before playing two first-class matches for Gloucestershire, making an appearance each in the 1907 County Championship and the 1910 County Championship.  He joined the Coldstream Guards at the outbreak of war in 1914, serving in Salonika. It was here that he met King Alexander of Greece and his wife Aspasia Manos, to whom he was later to donate the Garden of Eden in Venice and with whom he remained good friends. Mentioned in dispatches four times, James was also a recipient of the Military Cross, Greek Military Cross, Order of the White Eagle with Swords (4th class), and the Chevalier Legion d'Honneur and was returned as Conservative member of parliament for Gloucester in the 1923 General Election, which he served until 1929.

In 1944 he purchased Achamore House and the island of Gigha where he set about planting a rhododendron garden that still exists today. His work as a rhododendron breeder earned him, in 1963, the Victoria Medal of Honour. He also set about using his experience of the family business to support the island's dairy industry.
Inheriting the Horlick baronetcy from his nephew in 1958, Sir James died at his home in Gigha on 31.December 1972 and was succeeded by his son, Sir John James McDonald Horlick.

Family
Sir James Married twice. First in 1909 to Flora McDonald Martin, CB, daughter of Col Cunliffe Martin and granddaughter of Sir James Ranald Martin. Their children were:
Rachel Katherine Horlick
Ursula Priscilla Marie Gabrielle Horlick
John James McDonald Horlick

He married secondly, in 1956, Joan Isabel MacGill.

References

1886 births
1972 deaths
Baronets in the Baronetage of the United Kingdom
British Army personnel of World War I
Recipients of the Military Cross
UK MPs 1923–1924
UK MPs 1924–1929
Conservative Party (UK) MPs for English constituencies
English cricketers
Oxford University cricketers
Gloucestershire cricketers
Officers of the Order of the British Empire
Victoria Medal of Honour recipients
Chevaliers of the Légion d'honneur
People from Brooklyn
People educated at Eton College
Alumni of Christ Church, Oxford
Cricketers from New York City
British sportsperson-politicians
Coldstream Guards officers
20th-century English businesspeople